The Xinkai Victory (新凯 凯胜) is a mid-size SUV produced and sold by Xinkai.

Overview
The second generation Xinkai Victory was revealed in July 2013, and was essentially a facelift of the first generation Xinkai Victory with a price range from 108,000 yuan to 129,800 yuan before discontinuation.

Despite the crossover-looking exterior, the Xinkai Victory was built on a rear wheel drive body on frame chassis and is therefore a sports utility vehicle and not a crossover. The engine options of the Xinkai Victory include a 2.0 liter petrol engine producing 122hp (90kW) at 5250rpm and a torque of 170Nm, and a 2.4 liter petrol engine producing 136hp (100kW) and a torque of 200Nm with both engines mated to a 6-speed manual gearbox.

The styling of the Xinkai Victory was especially controversial due to the exterior design being a complete copy of the second generation Lexus RX luxury crossover.

References

External links 

 Xinkai official site

Mid-size sport utility vehicles
Rear-wheel-drive vehicles
2010s cars
Cars of China